Indirizzo portoghese is the second album of the Italian singer Patrizia Laquidara, released in 2003 
by Genius Records/Virgin Records. It includes 13 songs.

Tracks
 Mielato - 3.16 - (P. Laquidara - A. Canto, Bungaro)
 Indirizzo portoghese - 3.31 - (P. Laquidara - P. Laquidara, A. Canto)
 Caotico - 3.14 - (P. Laquidara - A. Canto)
 Dentro qui - 3.55 - (P. Laquidara - A. Canto, P. Laquidara)
 Sciroppo di mirtilli - 3.58 - (P. Laquidara - A. Canto)
 Kanzi - 3.40 - (P. Laquidara - D. Sarno, Bungaro)
 Agisce - 3.36 - (P. Laquidara - Bungaro)
 Le rose - 3.14 - (G. Lapi - F. Mesolella, F. Spinetti)
 Essenzialmente - 2.51 - (P. Laquidara - P. Baù)
 Per causa d'amore - 3.35 - (Kaballà - M. Venuti)
 Uirapuro - 2.56 - (H. Valdemar)
 Lividi e fiori - 3.54 - (A. Romanelli, P. Laquidara - Bungaro, P. Laquidara)
 Cu cu rru cu cù paloma - 3.45 - (T. Méndez)

Singles
 Indirizzo portoghese
 Agisce, also in the Portuguese version titled Age, was used by a radio program on national network Rai Radio Uno.
 Lividi e fiori, participating to the 2003 edition of the Sanremo festival, where it won the Critics Prize and the Best Interpretation Prize.
 Per causa d'amore, used also in a musical video.

Trivia
The song Kanzi was inspired by the bonobo named this way, grown up and studied at the university of Georgia and able to communicate with human beings with a complex symbolic language.

External links
 Indirizzo portoghese

Patrizia Laquidara albums
2003 albums